Hanging On by a Thread is the second album by The Letter Black. It is their first album to be released on Tooth & Nail Records and their first album to not be released independently. The album was released on May 4, 2010, and has sold over 100,000 copies in the United States by 2011.

The album entered the Billboard Top Christian Albums chart at No. 10.

Track listing
This album includes "Moving On", "Hanging On by a Thread" and "Best of Me" from the Breaking the Silence EP.

Singles
The title track was released from the "Breaking the Silence EP" in 2009 and it charted at No. 10 on Christianrock.net.
 The second single, "Best of Me", charted in the Top 20 on the Weekend 22 chart. The third single from the album, "Believe", was released in September 2010. The band made a music video for "Hanging on by a Thread", which shows the band playing in a cluttered room. The band released a "Believe" music video on iTunes on November 17, 2010, which shows the band playing in a dark room, with screenshots of the silhouette of a cellist, and the band's lead singer, Sarah Anthony, escaping a dark room through a standalone door that leads into the light. The next single, "Fire With Fire", was released in February 2011 with an accompanying music video.

Chart positions

References

2010 albums
The Letter Black albums